This is a list of some of the breeds of sheep considered in France to be wholly or partly of French origin. Some may have complex or obscure histories, so inclusion here does not necessarily imply that a breed is predominantly or exclusively French.

 Aure et Campan
 Avranchin
 Barégeoise
 Basco-Béarnaise
 Belle Ile
 Berrichon de l'Indre
 Berrichon du Cher
 Bizet
 Blanc du Massif Central
 Bleu du Maine
 Boulonnaise
 Brigasque
 Castillonnaise
 Caussenarde des Garrigues
 Causses du Lot
 Charmoise
 Charollais
 Commune des Alpes
 Corse
 Cotentin
 Est à Laine Mérinos
 Grivette
 Ile-de-France
 Lacaune Lait
 Lacaune Viande
 Landaise
 Landes de Bretagne
 Limousine
 Lourdaise
 Manech Tête Noire
 Manech Tête Rousse
 Martinik
 Montagne Noire
 Mourerous
 Mérinos d'Arles
 Mérinos de Rambouillet
 Mérinos Précoce
 Noir du Velay
 Ouessant
 PréAlpes du Sud
 Raiole
 Rava
 Rouge de l'Ouest
 Rouge du Roussillon
 Roussin de La Hague
 Sasi Ardi
 Solognote
 Southdown Français
 Tarasconnaise
 Thônes et Marthod
 Vendéen

Extinct breeds 

 Alfort
 Ardes
 Artois
 Boischaut
 Brenne
 Cambrai
 Campan
 Cauchois
 Caussenard de la Lozère
 Champagne
 Châtillonais
 Choletais
 Corbières
 Crevant
 Franconie
 Gascon
 Larzac
 Lauraguais
 Maine à Tête Blanche
 Marchois
 Mérinos Champenois
 Mérinos de la Camargue
 Mérinos de Mauchamp
 Mérinos du Naz
 Morvandelle
 Moutons à Tête Noire
 Picard
 Roussillon Merino
 Ruthenois
 Ségala
 Soissonais
 St. Quentin
 Trun

References

 
Sheep